Clyde Milton Matthews, also spelled Mathews, (December 22, 1878 – December 29, 1929), was an American football coach. He served as head football coach at the University of Illinois at Urbana–Champaign in 1904 along with Arthur R. Hall, Justa Lindgren, and Fred Lowenthal, compiling a record of 9–2–1. He was the son of President of the Illinois Senate Milton W. Mathews.

Head coaching record

References

1878 births
1929 deaths
Illinois Fighting Illini football coaches
University of Illinois Urbana-Champaign alumni
People from Urbana, Illinois